The Valais Women's Cup is a two-day international women football tournament that features four women national teams. It is played at the Stade du Lussy in Châtel-St-Denis and at the Stade St-Germain in Savièse, Switzerland.

This tournament is the closing tournament of the Valais Football Summer Cups. The first edition of the competition have been won by the New Zealand women's national football team. The New Zealanders surprisingly beat Brazil in semi-finals for the first time of its history.

Amber Hearn was the player of tournament. With 3 goals, she was the best scorer of the competition andhave been elected as best player of the tournament.

Participants

The competition featured four women national teams:

 Brazil
 China
 Mexico
 New Zealand

Competition format

Matches

Semi-finals

Third place play-off

Final

Awards 

 Best player :  Amber Hearn
 Best goalkeeper :  Thaís Ribeiro Picarte

References

External links
 Official website

2013 in Brazilian women's football
2013 in Chinese football
2013–14 in Mexican football
2013–14 in New Zealand association football
2013
2013 in women's association football